The Ferrara Bible was a 1553 publication of the Ladino version of the Tanakh used by Sephardi Jews. It was paid for and made by Yom-Tob ben Levi Athias (the Portuguese Marrano known before his return to Judaism as Alvaro de Vargas, as typographer) and Abraham ben Salomon Usque (the Portuguese Marrano Duarte Pinhel, as translator), and was dedicated to Ercole II d'Este, Duke of Ferrara. Ercole's wife Renée of France was a Protestant, daughter of Louis XII of France.

This version is a revision of a translation which had long circulated among Spanish Jews. It is more formally entitled Biblia en Lengua Española Traducida Palabra por Palabra de la Verdad Hebrayca por Muy Excelentes Letrados, Vista y Examinada por el Oficio de la Inquisicion. Con Privilegio del Ylustrissimo Señor Duque de Ferrara. ("The Bible in the Spanish Language, Translated word for word from the true Hebrew by very excellent Literati, Viewed and Examined by the Office of the Inquisition [though the Inquisition would not have passed such a work]. With the Privilege of the most Illustrious Lord Duke of Ferrara.)

Two editions were printed, one dedicated to the duke, and one for the Jewish public dedicated to Doña Gracia Nasi.

Language
Its language follows closely the Hebrew syntax rather than that of everyday Judaeo-Spanish (Ladino), as per the norm for "vulgar" translations of the Scriptures. It is written entirely in the Latin alphabet, albeit with various diacritics suitable for expressing Ladino phonetics. This distinguishes this translation from others from the same century, printed in Constantinople entirely in Hebrew script.  Both were based on the previous Spanish oral tradition.

The tetragrammaton is translated as A. (for Adonai).

It was a basis for the 1569 translation of Casiodoro de Reina as shown in the "Amonestacion al Lector" found before the biblical text written by the translator himself wherein he writes the following:

See also

Reina-Valera
Spanish translations of the Bible

References

Further reading 

 Vargas-Pinel, article in Spanish with samples.

External links
Downloadable copy on Archive.org
Scan at the Biblioteca Virtual de Polígrafos

1553 books
Early printed Bibles
Judaeo-Spanish-language mass media
Sephardi Jews topics
Sephardi Jewish culture in Italy
Jewish Italian history
Jewish Portuguese history
Jewish Spanish history
Judaism in Italy
Judaism in Portugal
Judaism in Spain
Bible translations into Spanish